Spelaeodiscus is a genus of very small air-breathing land snails, terrestrial pulmonate gastropod mollusks in the family Spelaeodiscidae.

This is the type genus of the family Spelaeodiscidae.

Species 
The genus Spelaeodiscus contains the following species:
 Spelaeodiscus albanicus (Wagner, 1914)
 Spelaeodiscus bulgaricus (Subai & Dedov, 2008)
 Spelaeodiscus dejongi Gittenberger, 1969
 Spelaeodiscus hauffeni (Schmidt, 1855) - type species
 Spelaeodiscus obodensis Bole, 1965
 Spelaeodiscus triarius (Rossmässler, 1839) - synonym: Spelaeodiscus tatricus Hazay, 1883
 Spelaeodiscus unidentatus Bole, 1961

References

External links 
 http://www.animalbase.uni-goettingen.de/zooweb/servlet/AnimalBase/home/genus?id=620

Spelaeodiscidae
Taxa named by Spiridon Brusina
Taxonomy articles created by Polbot